Marionia hawaiiensis is a species of dendronotid nudibranch. It is a marine gastropod mollusc in the family Tritoniidae.

Distribution
This species was described from the Hawaiian Islands.

References

Tritoniidae
Gastropods described in 1860
Taxa named by William Harper Pease